In July 2016, the International Union for Conservation of Nature (IUCN) listed 1105 near threatened invertebrate species. Of all evaluated invertebrate species, 6.1% are listed as near threatened. 
The IUCN also lists 15 invertebrate subspecies as near threatened.

No subpopulations of invertebrates have been evaluated by the IUCN.

This is a complete list of near threatened invertebrate species and subspecies as evaluated by the IUCN.

Molluscs
There are 535 mollusc species and nine mollusc subspecies assessed as near threatened.

Gastropods
There are 477 gastropod species and four gastropod subspecies assessed as near threatened.

Stylommatophora
Stylommatophora includes the majority of land snails and slugs. There are 250 species and four subspecies in the order Stylommatophora assessed as near threatened.

Zonitids

Clausiliids
Species

Subspecies
Alopia bielzii clathrata
Macrogastra lineolata euzieriana

Helminthoglyptids

Camaenids
Species

Subspecies
Glyptorhagada wilkawillina umbilicata

Vertiginids

Cochlicellids

Trissexodontids

Helicids

Hygromiids
Species

Subspecies
Xerocrassa montserratensis betulonensis

Vitrinids

Chondrinids

Enids

Argnids

Other Stylommatophora species

Littorinimorpha
There are 115 species in the order Littorinimorpha assessed as near threatened.

Hydrobiids

Bithyniids

Moitessieriids

Assimineids
Omphalotropis circumlineata
Omphalotropis zelriolata

Pomatiopsids

Stenothyrids
Stenothyra khongi
Stenothyra wykoffi

Sorbeoconcha

Architaenioglossa
There are 41 species in the order Architaenioglossa assessed as near threatened.

Pupinids
Pupina coxeni
Pupina pfeifferi

Diplommatinids

Aciculids

Viviparids

Ampullariids

Craspedopomatids
Craspedopoma hespericum
Craspedopoma monizianum

Lower Heterobranchia species
Valvata rhabdota
Valvata stenotrema

Cycloneritimorpha

Hygrophila species

Neogastropoda
There are 29 species in the order Neogastropoda assessed as near threatened.

Buccinids
Ranella olearia
Ranella parthenopaeum

Muricids
Latiaxis babelis

Conids

Bivalvia
There are 57 species and five subspecies in the class Bivalvia assessed as near threatened.

Unionida
There are 49 species and five subspecies in the order Unionoida assessed as near threatened.

Unionids
Species

Subspecies

Hyriids
Southern river mussel (Hyridella narracanensis)
South Esk freshwater mussel (Velesunio moretonicus)

Cardiida

Venerida

Cephalopods
Giant Australian cuttlefish (Sepia apama)

Cnidaria
There are 176 species in the phylum Cnidaria assessed as near threatened.

Hydrozoa
Millepora murrayi

Anthozoa
There are 175 species in the class Anthozoa assessed as near threatened.

Alcyonacea
Organ pipe coral (Tubipora musica)

Scleractinia
There are 174 species in the order Scleractinia assessed as near threatened.

Euphyllids

Acroporids

Poritids

Brain corals

Pocilloporids

Mussids

Pectiniids

Siderastreids

Agariciids

Fungiids

Other Scleractinia species

Arthropods
There are 390 arthropod species and six arthropod subspecies assessed as near threatened.

Arachnids

Branchiopoda
Mono Lake brine shrimp (Artemia monica)
California linderiella (Linderiella occidentalis)

Entognatha
Blasconura batai
Lepidonella lecongkieti

Maxillopoda

Malacostracans
Malacostraca includes crabs, lobsters, crayfish, shrimp, krill, woodlice, and many others. There are 71 malacostracan species and six malacostracan subspecies assessed as near threatened.

Decapods
There are 71 decapod species and six decapod subspecies assessed as near threatened.

Parastacids

Gecarcinucids

Atyids
Species

Subspecies

Cambarids

Potamids

Other decapod species

Insects
There are 301 insect species assessed as near threatened.

Hemiptera

Orthoptera

Hymenoptera

Lepidoptera
Lepidoptera comprises moths and butterflies. There are 62 species in the order Lepidoptera assessed as near threatened.

Swallowtail butterflies

Lycaenids

Nymphalids

Other Lepidoptera species

Beetles
There are 56 beetle species assessed as near threatened.

Geotrupids

Click beetles

Scarabaeids

Other beetle species

Odonata
Odonata includes dragonflies and damselflies. There are 119 species in the order Odonata assessed as near threatened.

Chlorocyphids

Platycnemidids

Gomphids

Cordulegastrids

Corduliids

Calopterygids

Coenagrionids

Aeshnids

Libellulids

Other Odonata species

Other invertebrate species

See also 
 Lists of IUCN Red List near threatened species
 List of least concern invertebrates
 List of vulnerable invertebrates
 List of endangered invertebrates
 List of critically endangered invertebrates
 List of recently extinct invertebrates
 List of data deficient invertebrates

References 

Invertebrates
Near threatened invertebrates